Kazumi Okamura (born December 23, 1957) is a Japanese jurist who has served as an associate justice of the Supreme Court of Japan since 2019.

Education and Career 
Okamura was born on December 23, 1957, in Japan. She attended Waseda University and graduated with a degree in law in 1980. She was appointed as a legal apprentice in 1981, and earned a LL.M (Master of Laws) in 1988 from Harvard Law School. She served as a public prosecutor for over 30 years before being appointed to the Supreme Court.

Supreme Court 
On October 2, 2019, Okamura was appointed to the Supreme Court of Japan. In Japan, justices are formally nominated by the Emperor (at that time, Naruhito) but in reality the Cabinet chooses the nominees and the Emperor's role is a formality.

Okamura's term is scheduled to end on December 22, 2027 (one day before she turns 70). This is because all members of the court have a mandatory retirement age of 70.

References 

1957 births
Living people
Japanese jurists
Waseda University alumni
Harvard Law School alumni